is a Buddhist temple in Nara, Japan. Founded in the eighth century, the Hondō is a National Treasure and a number of other buildings and temple treasures have been designated Important Cultural Properties.

History

In the late seventh century Ono no Tobito erected a set of public baths on Mount Tomi outside Nara and enshrined an image of Yakushi. In 734 Emperor Shōmu instructed Gyōki to erect a hall on the site, and two years later the Indian monk Bodhisena, noticing a resemblance to the Vulture Peak, founded the Ryōsen-ji. The Hondō was rebuilt in 1283. Toyotomi Hideyoshi granted the temple lands valued at a hundred koku. In the Meiji period many of the monk's quarters were abandoned and over two hundred images were burned. Restored in 1940, the temple has been revived.

Buildings
 Hondō (1283), 5x6 bay, irimoya-zukuri, tiled roof (National Treasure)
 Niōmon (1516), three bay, one door (Important Cultural Property)
 Three storey pagoda (1356), hinoki bark roof (ICP)
 Shōrō (mid-Muromachi period), single bay, irimoya-zukuri, hinoki bark roof (ICP)

Treasures
 Wall painting inside the three-storey pagoda (late Kamakura period to Nambokuchō period) (ICP)
 Seated statue of Yakushi Nyorai (ICP)
 Statues of Nikkō Bosatsu and Gakkō Bosatsu (ICP)
 Zushi (1285) (ICP)
 Statues of Jūni Shinshō (Kamakura period) (ICP)
 Plaque of Buddha triad (Hakuhō period) (ICP)
 Seated statue of Amida Nyorai (twelfth century) (ICP)
 Seated statue of Dainichi Nyorai (late Heian period) (ICP)
 Statue of Jūichimen Kannon (early Heian period) (ICP)
 Statue of Bishamonten (twelfth century) (ICP)
 Statues of Jikokuten and Bishamonten (late Kamakura period) (ICP)
 Statue of Jizō Bosatsu (1256) (ICP)
 Pendant disc of Yakushi triad (1366) (ICP)
 Pendant disc (Kamakura period) (ICP)
 Seated statue of Gyōki
 Seated statue of Bodhisena

Jūrokusho Jinja
 is now an independent shrine, but before the Meiji period served Ryōsen-ji in a tutelary capacity. The Honden (1384) and subordinate Sumiyoshi Jinja Honden and Ryūō Jinja Honden (both 1386) have been designated Important Cultural Properties.

See also
 List of National Treasures of Japan (temples)
Thirteen Buddhist Sites of Yamato

References

External links

  Ryōsenji - Founding & History
  Ryōsenji homepage

Buddhist temples in Nara, Nara
National Treasures of Japan
En no Gyōja